Tessa Tamplin (born 3 March 2001) is an Australian soccer player who plays for Newcastle Jets in the A-League Women. She has previously played for Servette in the Swiss Women's Super League.

Club career

Newcastle Jets
Tamplin began her career as part of Newcastle Jets' academy, before being given her senior debut against Perth Glory after being promoted from a scholarship player. She played four games in her debut season (2018/19), including scoring one goal.  Tamplin started all but one game in the subsequent two seasons (2019/20 & 2020/21), playing mostly as a right back.  In July 2021, the club announced that following being awarded with the Jets Rising Star award for the season, Tamplin left the club to take up an opportunity overseas.

Servette
After leaving Newcastle Jets, Tamplin joined Swiss Women's Super League defending champions Servette, signing an initial one-year contract, including an option for an additional season. Since joining she has made regular appearances at both right wing and right back including 4 starts in 7 appearances in the Women's UEFA Champions League, as well as one appearance in the Swiss Cup.

Return to Newcastle Jets
After one season in Switzerland, Tamplin returned to Australia and signed once more with Newcastle Jets.

International career
Tamplin is a dual national holding both Australian and Dutch citizenship.  Tamplin was a member of Australia's underage teams including being a member of the 2019 AFC U-19 Women's Championship and the 2016/17 AFC U-16 Women's Championship.  She also took part in the Future Matilda Program in 2018 and 2019.

References 

Newcastle Jets FC (A-League Women) players
Servette FC Chênois Féminin players
2001 births
Living people
Australian women's soccer players
Women's association footballers not categorized by position